The 1941 Oregon Webfoots football team was an American football team that represented the University of Oregon in the Pacific Coast Conference (PCC) during the 1941 college football season.  In their fourth season under head coach Tex Oliver, the Webfoots compiled a 5–5 record (4–4 against PCC opponents), finished in fifth place in the PCC, and were outscored by a total of 184 to 136. The team played its home games at Hayward Field in Eugene, Oregon.

Schedule

References

Oregon
Oregon Ducks football seasons
Oregon Webfoots football